The Martha Springer Botanical Garden is a botanical garden on the campus of Willamette University, in Salem, Oregon, United States. Opened in 1988, the  garden contains twelve smaller gardens stretched along the Mill Race that bisects the campus.

About
The garden was dedicated in 1988 in honor of Professor Martha Springer, a biologist at the school. Elaine Joines served as the first curator of the garden. The garden's long, narrow site behind the athletic building is divided into 12 smaller gardens, including a butterfly garden, herb garden, alpine rock garden, theme borders, and ethnobotany gardens. Much of the garden contains species native to the state of Oregon. Other plants include pink varieties of Lagerstroemia. The botanical garden lies along the Mill Race that splits the school's campus after leaving the Thomas Kay Woolen Mill site to the east.

Martha Springer Botanical Garden is sometimes referred to as a secret garden since few people are aware of its existence and it is tucked away behind buildings on the campus. Other features of the free garden include benches, a rock fountain, and roses. The  site is used for educating students at the school, and is open to the public.

See also
List of botanical gardens in the United States

References

External links
Willamette page on Martha Springer Botanical Garden

Botanical gardens in Oregon
Willamette University
Parks in Salem, Oregon
1988 establishments in Oregon